Petra  Bockle (born 14 May 1995) known professionally as Petra, is a rapper, songwriter and singer of Kenyan and Seychellois descent. She performs in both Swahili and English, sometimes switching back and forth. She cites 2Pac, Eminem, MC Lyte and Lil' Kim as her musical influences.

Early life
Petra Bockle was born to a Kenyan mother and Seychellois father.  Her father died in 2004, when Petra was nine years old, She then started becoming active with music around this time as a form of therapy.

Career
Petra first appeared on the "Ligi Soo Remix" which featured her along with other Kenyan artists. This includes: Kaka Sungura, Madtraxx, MwendaMchizi Jay A and Mejja among others. She then disappeared from the music scene for a while. In 2018 she collaborated with Kenyan hip hop artist Khaligraph Jones on a song titled "Rider". In the music video for "Rider", which features Khaligraph Jones, Petra is seen eating raw meat, which was actual raw liver, caused controversy.

A month later she was featured on another song titled "Khali Kartel Cypher". Petra performed alongside Mr Eazi at the Hypefest concert during his Kenya tour. Her latest single "i got that" features singer Victoria Kimani.

Discography

Singles

As featured artist

Awards and nominations
In 2012, Petra won an award for best female artist at the Kenya Coast Music Awards. Later on in 2015 she received an award for best female hip hop artist at the Pwani Celebrity Awards.

References

Living people
1995 births
Kenyan women rappers
Kenyan rappers
American rappers
Kenyan musicians
Seychellois entertainers
21st-century American rappers
21st-century American women musicians
21st-century women rappers